Christian Stuff (born 11 August 1982 is a German former footballer who played as a defender.

References

External links
 

Living people
1982 births
People from East Berlin
Footballers from Berlin
German footballers
1. FC Saarbrücken players
SV Eintracht Trier 05 players
1. FC Union Berlin players
SV Lichtenberg 47 players
FC Hansa Rostock players
2. Bundesliga players
3. Liga players
Association football defenders